The Associated Presbyterian Churches (APC) is a Scottish Calvinist fundamentalist denomination (with a congregation in Canada), formed in 1989 from part of the community of the Free Presbyterian Church of Scotland.

History 
The division occurred because of a continuing difference over liberty of conscience (as defined in the Westminster Confession of Faith), which came to a head over the attendance of Lord Mackay of Clashfern at a Requiem Mass which formed part of the funeral of a colleague, former Lord Justice Clerk Lord Wheatley.  As Mackay was Lord Advocate for Scotland, it was expected that he attend the funeral of a deceased member of the judiciary; Wheatley was also a friend of Mackay. However, Mackay was also an elder in the Free Presbyterian Church, and its leadership found his attendance intolerable, as it regards the Catholic Church as spurious and the Mass as idolatrous. As a result, Mackay was suspended from office as an elder. Some in the church disagreed with this punishment and a split ensued, not only over the Mackay affair but also the ongoing issue of freedom of conscience. The people who formed the APC believed that liberty of conscience was not being given sufficient place in the Free Presbyterian Church, and that the disciplinary action taken by the Free Presbyterian authorities against Lord Mackay was inappropriate.

Doctrine 
The Associated Churches website states: "We believe that it is correct to allow Christians to make their own decisions on matters that are not fundamental to the faith."

The church's beliefs "are stated in a confession that is catholic, Calvinist, and biblical, and which states the historic convictions of the Church of Scotland" the Westminster Confession of Faith.

Churches

International organisations 
Associate Presbyterian Church is a member of the World Reformed Fellowship.

External links
Associated Churches website
Free Presbyterian Church of Scotland

References 

Christian organizations established in 1989
Presbyterian denominations established in the 20th century
Presbyterian denominations in Scotland
Members of the World Reformed Fellowship
Reformed denominations in the United Kingdom
1989 establishments in Scotland